The 1986–87 FIBA Korać Cup was the 16th edition of FIBA's Korać Cup basketball competition. The Spanish FC Barcelona defeated the French Limoges CSP in the final.

First round

|}

Second round

|}

Automatically qualified to round of 16
  Mobilgirgi Caserta
  FC Barcelona
  Limoges CSP

Round of 16

Semi finals

|}

Finals

|}

External links
 1986–87 FIBA Korać Cup @ linguasport.com
1986–87 FIBA Korać Cup

1986–87
1986–87 in European basketball